The year 1991 was the 208th year of the Rattanakosin Kingdom of Thailand. It was the 46th year of the reign of King Bhumibol Adulyadej (Rama IX), and is reckoned as the year 2534 in the Buddhist Era. Significant events include the coup d'état against the government of Chatichai Choonhavan and the tragedy of Lauda Air Flight 004.

Incumbents
King: Bhumibol Adulyadej
Crown Prince: Vajiralongkorn
Prime Minister: 
 until 23 February: Chatichai Choonhavan
 24 February-2 March: National Peace Keeping Council (junta)
 starting 2 March: Anand Panyarachun
Supreme Patriarch: Nyanasamvara Suvaddhana

Events
26 May-Lauda Air Flight 004

Births

Deaths

See also

 1991 Thailand national football team results

References

 
1990s in Thailand
Years of the 20th century in Thailand
Thailand
Thailand